= Intrepid Records =

Intrepid Records may refer to:

- Intrepid Records (US), a short-lived American imprint owned and operated by Mercury Records
